Parliamentary elections were held in Niue on 12 April 2014. Candidates supportive of the government of Premier Toke Talagi won 12 of the 20 seats.

Background
Following the 2011 election, Toke Talagi was re-elected as premier for a second term. The Assembly was dissolved on 7 March 2014.

Electoral system
Of the 20 Niue Assembly members, six were elected on a common roll and fourteen in single-member constituencies. There were no political parties in Niue at the time of the election, and all candidates were independents.

Results

Common roll

Constituency results

References

2014 elections in Oceania
General election
April 2014 events in Oceania
Elections in Niue
Non-partisan elections